Matthew Ebden and Samuel Groth were the defending champions but Ebden decided not to participate.
Groth partners up with Adam Feeney, but lost in the first round to John Peers and John-Patrick Smith.
Peers and Smith then went on to win the title, defeating John Paul Fruttero and Raven Klaasen in the final, 7–6(7–5), 6–4.

Seeds

Draw

Draw

References
 Main Draw

Doubles
2012 Doubles